Ricardo Alberto Darín (born 16 January 1957) is an Argentine actor, film director and film producer, he is considered one of the best and most prolific actors of Argentine cinema.

Considered one of the greatest and most acclaimed movie stars of his country, he played a number of parts in TV series for several years where he became popular as a young leading actor. His most prominent roles as a film actor include Nine Queens (2000), El hijo de la novia (2001), Luna de Avellaneda (2004), The Aura (2005) and La señal (2007), which was also his directorial debut.

He starred in the Academy Award winning film for Best Foreign Picture The Secret in Their Eyes (2009). In 2011, the Konex Foundation bestowed upon him their Diamond Award, one of the most prestigious awards in Argentina, for being the most important personality in entertainment in the last decade in his country. In 2015, he received the Goya Award for Best Actor for the film Truman.

Early life 
Darín was born in Buenos Aires, Argentina, on 26 January 1957, to actor Ricardo Darín Sr. and actress Renée Roxana. His family is of Italian and Lebanese origin, and has held strong ties to the Argentine showbusiness community. His parents divorced in 1969 when he was 12 years old, and his father died of cancer on 5 January 1989.

Career

Early years 
Darín was ten years old when he made his theater debut alongside his parents. By the age of sixteen he had achieved a stable position in television in Argentina, in TV shows such as Alta comedia and Estación Retiro, under the patronage of Alberto Migré, Argentina's major TV producer at the time.

TV success (1980s) 
During the 1980s, while still collaborating with Migré, Darín was acclaimed as one of the galancitos (Spanish for "charmers"), a group of young actors that adapted popular TV programs into theater productions. The galancitos were very popular all over Argentina. In 1987, Darín starred in the television show Estrellita mía, with Andrea Del Boca, and two years later in the show Rebelde, with Grecia Colmenares.

He switched to comedy in the early 1990s, which led to his greatest television success co-starring in the remake of the 1970s TV show Mi cuñado (1993–1996), alongside Luis Brandoni.

Film success (1990s) 
Despite his success on television, Darín never left theater and continued to perform in productions such as La extraña pareja (a Spanish adaptation of Neil Simon's The Odd Couple) (1984), Taxi (1985), Sugar (1986–1987), Rumores (1990), Algo en común (1995) and Art (1997–1999). He debuted as theater director in 1990, with the production Pájaros in the nait, starring Adrián Suar, Diego Torres and Leonardo Sbaraglia.

He started his film career by appearing in films mainly aimed for young audiences, such as He nacido en la ribera, Así es la vida, La rabona and Los éxitos del amor, La carpa del amor, La discoteca del amor and La canción de Buenos Aires. He then shifted to more mature roles, which permitted him to appear in films such as El desquite, Revancha de un amigo and La Rosales.

The critics first noted and praised Darín for his role in the film Perdido por perdido, directed by the newcomer Alberto Lecchi. He then appeared in Eduardo Mignogna's The Lighthouse (El faro in Spanish), and starred in Juan José Campanella's Same Love, Same Rain (El mismo amor, la misma lluvia in Spanish), which brought him further critical acclaim. But his success on film was established by his role as Marcos, a con artist in the midst of Argentina's financial crisis, in the 2000 film Nine Queens (Nueve Reinas in Spanish), in which he starred alongside Gastón Pauls.

International acknowledgement (2000s) 
After the success of Nine Queens, Darín played a minor role in Mignona's La fuga (The Escape), in 2001. In that same year, he co-starred in Son of the Bride (El hijo de la novia), alongside Norma Aleandro and Héctor Alterio. The film was a commercial and critical success, resulting in its nomination for an Academy Award for Best Foreign Language Film and its winning the Silver Condor Award for Best Film.

Darín then starred in the comedy film Samy y yo, with Angie Cepeda, in 2002. He also starred with Cecilia Roth in Kamchatka, a drama that was Argentina's official submission for the 2002 Academy Award for Best Foreign Language Film, but it was not nominated by the Academy.

In 2004 he co-starred with actress Mercedes Morán in the film Moon of Avellaneda (Luna de Avellaneda), in which he played a man trying to save his childhood club from bankruptcy. In 2005 he portrayed a taxidermist with photographic memory who unknowingly gets himself involved in a crime scheme in the film The Aura. This last performance earned him an Argentine Film Critics Association Silver Condor Award for Best Actor and a Clarín Award for Best Actor.

In 2006 he and Juan José Campanella were awarded Spanish citizenship by certificate of naturalization, a special concession given by the Kingdom of Spain to people of particular merit. That same year, he starred in the Spanish film The Education of Fairies (La educación de las hadas), alongside Bebe and Irène Jacob.

In 2007 he appeared in the film XXY, where he plays the troubled father of an intersex teenage daughter. That same year, he starred and debuted as a film director in the film La señal (The Signal), a project Eduardo Magnogna left unfinished after his death.

In 2009 he starred with Soledad Villamil and Guillermo Francella in The Secret in Their Eyes (El secreto de sus ojos), a film by Juan José Campanella. The film won the Academy Award for Best Foreign Language Film and was the second biggest box-office hit in the history of Argentine cinema. His performance as Benjamín Espósito earned Darín a second Silver Condor Award for Best Actor and his first nomination for the Goya Award in that same category.

Also in 2009 he appeared in the Spanish film El baile de la Victoria, which earned him a nomination for the Goya Award, this time as Best Actor in a Supporting Role.

Continued success (2010s) 
In 2010 he starred in Pablo Trapero's Carancho, with Martina Gusmán, where he played the role of an unscrupulous lawyer.

In 2011, along with Muriel Santa Ana and Ignacio Huang, he starred in Sebastián Borensztein's successful Chinese Take-Away (Un cuento chino). That same year he was awarded two Konex Awards: the Platinum Konex for Best Actor, and the Bright Konex for the Most Influential Figure in Argentine Show Business in the 2001–2010 Decade.

In 2012 he starred in White Elephant (Elefante blanco), again along with Martina Gusmán. The following year he starred in the box-office hits Tesis sobre un homicidio (Thesis on a Homicide) and 7th Floor (Séptimo).

In 2013 he returned to theater and starred in the play Escenas de la vida conyugal (a Spanish adaptation of Ingmar Bergman's Scenes from a Marriage), alongside Valeria Bertuccelli. In 2015 he reprised the role with Érica Rivas, in Mar del Plata. His performance earned him the Sea Star (Estrella de Mar) Award for Best Actor in a Dramatic Comedy.

In 2014 he starred in Wild Tales (Relatos salvajes), the biggest box-office hit in Argentine cinema history, along with Leonardo Sbaraglia, Oscar Martínez, Érica Rivas, Rita Cortese, Darío Grandinetti and Julieta Zylberberg. This was his third film to get nominated for an Academy Award. His performance earned him his third nomination for the Goya Awards, this time in the Best Actor category.

In 2015 he starred in Cesc Gay's Truman, which earned him a Concha de Plata award for Best Actor at the San Sebastián International Film Festival.

Recent work (2020s) 
In 2022, he starred in Argentina, 1985 as Julio César Strassera, who served as Chief Prosecutor during the Trial of the Juntas in 1985.

As of 2023, Darín has starred in four film that have been nominated for the Academy Award for Best International Feature Film: Son of the Bride (2001), The Secret in Their Eyes (2009), Wild Tales (2014) and Argentina, 1985.

Personal life 
In 1988, Darín married fellow Argentine Florencia Bas, with whom he has two children, Chino and Clara. His younger sister, is an actress.

Darín rejected the opportunity to play a drug trafficker in the Denzel Washington film Man on Fire, as he disapproved of Hollywood's negative stereotyping of Latin Americans.

Since 2016, Ricardo Darín has been a patron of DreamAgo, an international screenwriters association.

Filmography

Film

Television

References

External links 
 
 

1957 births
Living people
Argentine male film actors
Argentine male television actors
Argentine people of Lebanese descent
Argentine people of Italian descent
Male actors from Buenos Aires
Illustrious Citizens of Buenos Aires
Naturalised citizens of Spain